Mau Ping is an area and the site of a former village in Hong Kong. It is located within Ma On Shan Country Park and is administratively part of Sha Tin District.

Administration
Mau Ping is a recognized village under the New Territories Small House Policy.

History
The village of Mau Ping, together with neighboring Mui Tsz Lam, were historically part of the Luk Yeuk (league), centered on the township of Sai Kung. At the time of the 1911 census, the population of Mau Ping (Mu Ping) was 124. The number of males was 57.

Conservation
A dense woodland with an area of 3.7 hectares, within the Mau Ping area, has been listed as a Site of Special Scientific Interest since 1979.

Access
Mau Ping is only accessible by hiking paths, including Mau Ping Ancient Trail from Mui Tsz Lam, Pak Kong Ancient Trail from Pak Kong, Wong Chuk Shan Ancient Trail from Buffalo Pass via Wong Chuk Shan, and Section 4 of the MacLehose Trail.

See also
 Mau Ping New Village

References

Further reading
 

Sha Tin District
Villages in Sha Tin District, Hong Kong
Former populated places in Hong Kong